Ayachi Hammami (Arabic: العياشي الهمامي; born in 1959) is a Tunisian politician. He was the second minister after the prime minister and is responsible for human rights and relations with constitutional bodies and civil society.

Biography 
Ayachi Hammami holds a diploma of in-depth studies in international law and is a lawyer at the Court of Cassation. He is also a member of the steering committee of the Tunisian Human Rights League and of the executive office of EuroMed Rights.

Left activist, he was a founding member of the collective of 18 October for rights and freedoms. 
and sat on the Higher Authority for Realisation of the Objectives of the Revolution, Political Reform and Democratic Transition.

In 2019, his name was proposed by the Popular Front to be one of the future members of the new Constitutional Court. However, his candidacy faced fierce opposition, the presence of his name even provoked a blockage in the establishment of the court according to opposition deputies. On 27 February 2020, he was appointed Minister to Prime Minister of Tunisia responsible for Human Rights and Relations with constitutional bodies. and civil society.

References

Government ministries of Tunisia
Tunisian activists
1959 births
Living people